Ionuț Oktay Özkara (born 11 August 2000) is a Romanian professional footballer who plays as a centre back for FC Voluntari. He made his debut in Liga I on 4 December 2020, in a match between FC Voluntari and Academica Clinceni, ended with the score of 3-3.

References

External links
 

2000 births
Living people
Footballers from Bucharest
Romanian footballers
Association football defenders
Liga I players
FC Voluntari players
Liga II players
AFC Unirea Slobozia players